Leeds East Academy (formerly Parklands Girls High School) is a secondary school with academy status, in the Seacroft area of Leeds, West Yorkshire, England.

The school was previously an all-girls school, being the last single-sex school in Leeds. Parklands Girls High School was particularly small for an urban secondary school with only around 350 pupils; it was this which suggested to Leeds City Council that segregated education was no longer popular and prompted them to make it a mixed school and it was renamed Parklands High School.

The school is now an academy and has a partnership with Leeds West Academy and Leeds City Academy as part of The White Rose Academies Trust. Leeds West and Leeds East Academies were previously sponsored by E-ACT, however in 2014 the schools joined the White Rose Academies Trust with Leeds City College as their sponsor. The Trust are now part of the Luminate Education Group, which also oversees Leeds City College, Keighley College, and Harrogate College.  The school moved to new buildings in April 2013.Ofsted

As part of the White Rose Academies Trust, Leeds East Academy were judged as "Requires Improvement" by Ofsted following inspections in 2015 and 2017. However, in May 2019, the academy was inspected once again by Ofsted and it was judged as "Good' in all areas.

Notable alumni
Alison Lowe, Deputy Mayor of West Yorkshire for Policing and Crime
Jill Mortimer, Member of Parliament for Hartlepool
Louise Rennison, Author and Comedian

References

External links
Leeds East Academy official website

Seacroft
Secondary schools in Leeds
Academies in Leeds